Andrea "Andi" Tóth (born 18 January 1999) is a Hungarian actress and singer, most notable for winning of the fifth series of X-Faktor, acting in the television show Válótársak, and for participating in A Dal.

Life
Tóth was born in Oradea (Nagyvárad), in Romania on 18 January 1999. She has been interested in singing since childhood and went to the Lyceum of Arts in her hometown, where she studied drawing. By age 13, she had already participated in various competitions and small performances. In 2014, she participated in the fifth season of X Faktor, of which she did not duel until the finale, and won. She became one youngest winners in X Factor history, as well as the first winner in Hungary from the Girls category. She was mentored by Róbert Szikora.

In 2015, the then 16-year-old released her first music video for Legyek én!, and was cast in Madách Theatre's production of Les Misérables. She then was a part of a new series on RTL Klub, Válótársak, as Noémi Jakab.

In 2016, she participated in A Dal 2016, the 2016 of the national selection of Hungary for the Eurovision Song Contest, in a duet with Olivér Berkes, with the song "Seven Seas". In 2016, she also released Itt vagyok! and Tovább.

She competed in A Dal 2017 with the song "I've got a Fire" and was eliminated in the second heat.

She currently acts at the Madách Theatre. She last played Eponine in Les Misérables.

Songs sung at X-Faktor
 Legyen valami
 Let's Get Rocked
 Purple Rain
 Walk This Way
 Right Here Waiting
 The Show Must Go On
 Free Your Mind
 Jailhouse Rock
Cabaret
 Ő még csak most 14
 Sweet Child O' Mine
 No Diggity/Shout
 Elég volt
 I Will Always Love You
 One Night Only
 Játszom
 Shake up Christmas
 Legyek én! (Winning song)

Discography

Chart-topping songs

Personal life

Her partner is Hungarian singer Peti Marics from the music due Valmar. They live together since the beginning of 2023. They also have a dog in their house. They are also planning to have a baby in the future.

References

Further reading
 Tóth Andi: „Szerintem a legjobb úton haladok” (kozpont.ro, 2015. augusztus 24.) (Hungarian)

External links

 

1999 births
People from Oradea
Living people
Romanian musicians of Hungarian descent
21st-century Hungarian women singers
21st-century Hungarian actresses
Hungarian child actresses